Harmony was launched in 1798 in Lancaster as a West Indiaman. Between 1805 and 1807 she sailed to the Pacific on a privateering voyage (Spain and England then being at war). Early in the voyage she was engaged in a single ship action in which her target repelled the attack, killing Harmonys master and inflicting severe casualties on her crew. Although Harmony returned to trading with the West Indies, in 1817 she made one voyage to India under a licence from the British East India Company. On her return she traded between Hull and Petersburg, and Quebec. New owners in 1821 decided to use her as a whaler in the northern whale fishery. She was lost there on her first whaling voyage.

Career
Harmony first appeared in Lloyd's Register (LR) in 1799.

After the resumption of war with France, Captain John Reid acquired a letter of marque on 22 September 1803.

Both were sailing from St Thomas at the time. Harmony and May rescued the crew and brought them into Liverpool.

When Harmony returned to Liverpool on 28 February 1805, she carried a cargo of 110 tons of fustic, 824 bales of cotton, and staves. She had come from St Thomas via Charleston.

Voyage to the Pacific (1805–1807): Captain Ludwige Affleck acquired a letter of marque on 25 June 1805. On 22 September Harmony, Affleck, master, sailed from the Clyde for Madeira. He determined to capture her. The winds were too light to permit Harmony to get close to the brig so Affleck took 23 men in one boat and 22 men in two other boats, and rowed towards the brig. As they came alongside the men on the brig opened fire with small arms and repelled the attack. The British had to withdraw, having lost Affleck and eight men killed, and 18 men wounded, many seriously.

In December 1806 Harmony, Smith (late Affleck), master, was at Rio de Janeiro. There she took on enough men to increase her complement to more than 100 men.  

On 28 October 1806, Harmony, [Frazer] Smith, master, late Affleck, was reported well on the coast of Chili, and was expected to sail for England 16 days later. On 3 September 1807 Harmony, Smith, master, arrived back in the Clyde from the South Seas.

Captain John Innis acquired a letter of marque on 18 November 1807.

Innis sailed Harmony to Demerara. On her way back to Britain in June 1808 she had to put into Grenada, having sustained damage. On 8 September Harmony, Innes, master, coming from Suriname, arrived at Gravesend.

On her way back from the Yucatan, Harmony, Malcolm, master, had to put into Havana for repairs. On 20 December 1809 she arrived back at Gravesend.

In 1813 the EIC had lost its monopoly on the trade between India and Britain. British ships were then free to sail to India or the Indian Ocean under a licence from the EIC.

On 4 July 1817, Harmony, Wishart, master, sailed for Bombay under a licence from the EIC. She arrived in Bengal on 27 November. She arrived back at Hull on 1 August 1818.

Fate
Harmony became a whaler in the northern whale fishery whaler and was lost in Davis Strait.

The Register of Shipping for 1822 had the annotation "LOST" by her name.

Notes, citations, and references
Notes

Citations

References
 

1798 ships
Age of Sail merchant ships of England
Privateer ships of the United Kingdom
Whaling ships
Maritime incidents in 1821